Åsetesrett (archaic spelling Åsædesret) is one of the Ancient Norwegian property laws under which  the eldest child has priority inheritance rights to agricultural property.

Summary
Åsetesretten is a priority right to take over an agricultural property inheritance. When the farmer dies, only lineal descendants have inheritance rights to  agricultural property.  If there are several agricultural properties involved, the eldest child  may choose only one parcel. The heir is obliged to pay the other siblings their share of the estate (originally only 50% to sisters). Traditionally the value of the estate was given by the father or else is estimated, usually below its actual valuation. If the father left no son, his eldest surviving daughter inherited.

Before reforms of the 1970s, daughters did inherit, but their share was limited to one-half that of the sons' shares. Currently there is an appraisal, but the value is typically low. If a farm or estate is of such a size that several families can exist on it, the father is allowed to divide it among his children; however, this is on the condition that the eldest son or daughter will not receive less than one-half of the farm or estate. This serves to limit the partitioning of agricultural farm land.

See also
 Primogeniture

References

Other sources
Falkanger, Thor  (1984) Odelsretten og åsetesretten (Oslo: Universitetsforlaget) 
Rygg, Ola; Oluf Skarpnes  (2002) Odelsloven med kommentarer  (Oslo: Universitetsforlaget)

External links
Åsetesretten (Fosna-Folket 02.12.2005)

History of agriculture
Inheritance
Property law of Norway
Legal history of Norway
Agriculture in Norway
Succession acts